Chalakudy is a municipal town situated on the banks of Chalakudy River in Thrissur district of the Kerala state in India. It is the headquarters of Chalakudy taluk. It is the base camp for travellers to Athirappilly Falls and Vazhachal Falls. Chalakudy lies on National Highway 544 and located about 47 km (23 mi) north of the city of Kochi, and 30 km (19 mi) south of Thrissur.

Etymology
History says during the second Chera dynasty, people outside kerala visited Chalakudy to learn vedas and Kalaripayattu from Chukkikulam Shala. These people lived in the banks of Chalakudy River and this accommodation is called Kudi. The combination of these two words Shalakudi is later modified into Chalakudy.

Administration
Chalakudy Municipality came into existence in the year 1970. The municipality covering an area of 25.23 km2 is divided into 36 electoral wards. Chalakudy is a Grade-II municipality. Chalakudy is an assembly constituency & Lok Sabha constituency. Benny Behanan (INC) is the current MP of the Parliamentary constituency and  T J Saneesh Kumar Joseph (INC) is the current M.L.A. of Legislative Assembly Constituency.

Transport

Railways
The main rail transport system in Chalakudy is operated by the Southern Railway zone of Indian Railways, and comes under Trivandrum railway division.

Airport
The nearest airport is Cochin International Airport in Nedumbassery which is 19 km from Chalakudy. All the major domestic and international flights are available here. Direct flights are available to  New Delhi, Mumbai, Chennai, Bangalore, Kolkata, Hyderabad, Pune, Goa, Mangaluru, Kozhikode, Thiruvananthapuram, Dubai, Sharjah, Abu Dhabi, Doha, Bahrain, Kuwait, Muscat, Malé, Colombo, Kuala Lumpur, Singapore, Salalah, Jeddah and  Riyadh.

Education

Schools 
Carmel Higher Secondary School, Chalakudy  
CKM NSS Senior Secondary School
CMI Public School Chalakudy
Crescent Public School
Vyasa Vidyanikethan

Colleges 
Panampilly Memorial Government College
Sacred Heart College Chalakudy
Southern College of Engineering & Technology

Important Persons
C. S. Venkiteswaran
Antony Thachuparambil
Jose Pellissery
Kalabhavan Mani
Lijo Jose Pellissery
A K Lohithadas
Porinju Veliyath
B. D. Devassy
Raghavan Thirumulpad

References

External links 

Official website .

 
Cities and towns in Thrissur district